Manuchehr, Manuchar, Manuchihr, or Manouchehr (Manūčehr, Old Persian: Manōčihr, Avestan: Manuščiθra) is a Persian male given name meaning "Heaven's face". It consists of two parts Manu (Manou), which means "Heaven" in the old Persian language; and Chehr, which means "face".

Given name

Manuchehr
 Manuchehr, mythical hero from Shahnameh.
 Manuchehr I, Manuchehr II and Manuchehr III, the 11th, 17th and 19th shahs of medieval Shirvan
 Manuchihr, king of Ziyarids
 Manuchehr Eliasi, Iranian Member of Parliament
 Manuchehr Ghorbanifar, Iranian arms dealer
 Manuchehr Jamali, Iranian philosopher
 Manuchehr Shahrokhi, Iranian-American academic

Manouchehr
 Manouchehr Atashi, Persian poet
 Manouchehr Eghbal, Prime Minister of Iran
 Manouchehr Ganji, Iranian politician
 Manouchehr Khan Gorji, Iranian official
 Manouchehr Mahamadi, Iranian film producer
 Manouchehr Mottaki, Iranian Government Minister
 Manouchehr Yektai, Iranian-American painter

Manuchekhr
 Manuchekhr Dzhalilov, Tajik football player

Manuchar
(Variant of the name used in the Republic of Georgia)
 Manuchar I Dadiani, Georgian prince
 Manuchar II Jaqeli, Georgian noble
 Manuchar III Jaqeli, Georgian noble
 Manuchar, Prince of Abkhazia, prince of the Principality of Abkhazia
 Manuchar Kvirkvelia, Georgian Greco-Roman wrestler
 Manuchar Machaidze, Georgian footballer
 Manuchar Markoishvili, Georgian basketballer
 Manuchar Tskhadaia, Georgian wrestler

As a surname
(used mainly in Armenian surnames)
 Armen Manucharyan, Armenian footballer 
 Ashot Manucharyan, Armenian teacher
 Edgar Manucharyan, Armenian footballer
 Nina Manucharyan, Armenian film actress

Persian masculine given names